Samuel Julius Lilly IV (born February 12, 1965) is a former professional American football defensive back in the National Football League. He played for the Philadelphia Eagles (1989–1990), the San Diego Chargers (1990), and the Los Angeles Rams (1991–1992). He played collegiately for the Georgia Tech football team.

Professional career

New York Giants
Lilly was drafted 202nd overall in the 1988 NFL Draft by the New York Giants.  Lilly suffered a knee injury and was placed on injured reserve.  Following the 1988 season, Lilly was not protected from Free Agency and became an unrestricted free agent.

Philadelphia Eagles
Lilly signed a two-year contract March 13, 1989 with the Philadelphia Eagles.   Lilly played a reserve nickel role with Philadelphia playing in 23 games however late in the 1989 season Lilly was released by the Eagles after being deactivated three straight weeks on November 26, 1990.

San Diego Chargers
After being released by the Eagles towards the end of the 1990 season, Lilly was picked up on December 5, 1990, by the San Diego Chargers during their bye week.  After being inactive in the first week following the bye.  Lilly played in the final two games of the season making a key special teams play vs. the Chiefs by downing a punt inside the opponents 1 yard line.

Los Angeles Rams
Following the 1990 season, Lilly again found himself an unprotected Free Agent and signed a contract with the Los Angeles Rams on April 1, 1991.  Lilly made the first and only start of his NFL game on December 8 1991 versus the Atlanta Falcons, who opened up with a 4 WR set which the Rams countered with 7 DBs including Lilly.  Lilly was again left as an unprotected Free Agent at the end of the 1991 season.

Tampa Bay Buccaneers
Lilly signed with the Buccaneers on March 28, 1992.  Lilly was hampered in the preseason with a hamstring injury and was released by the Buccaneers August 24, 1992

Pittsburgh Steelers
Lilly was claimed on waivers August 26, 1992 after being waived by the Buccaneers however he was unable to make the final regular season cut and was waived by the Steelers just 5 days later.

Second Stint with Los Angeles Rams
After starting Rams cornerback Todd Lyght suffered a separated shoulder and was put on injured reserve, the Rams brought back Samuel Lilly for depth on September 22, 1992.  Lilly did not play beyond the 1992 season.  

1965 births
Living people
Players of American football from Anchorage, Alaska
American football cornerbacks
American football safeties
Georgia Tech Yellow Jackets football players
Philadelphia Eagles players
San Diego Chargers players
Los Angeles Rams players